Miles Staniforth Cater Smith,  (25 February 1869 – 14 January 1934) was an Australian politician, public servant and explorer. He served as a Senator for Western Australia from 1901 to 1906 and was later a senior public servant in the Territory of Papua and the Northern Territory of Australia.

Early life
Smith was born on 25 February 1869 in Kingston, Victoria. He was the son of English immigrants Margaret Gomersall and William John Smith. He was raised on his father's farming property and attended St Arnaud Grammar School in St Arnaud. He briefly studied engineering at the University of Melbourne and then began working for Goldsbrough Mort & Co in Melbourne.

In 1896, Smith moved to the Eastern Goldfields of Western Australia where he initially worked as a bookkeeper for C. R. Knight and Company in Coolgardie. He subsequently moved to Kalgoorlie where he was employed by Reuters Telegram Company and was a member of the West Kalgoorlie Progress Committee. He was elected to the Kalgoorlie Municipal Council in 1898 and served as mayor of Kalgoorlie from 1900 to 1901.

Politics
Smith supported the federation movement and was elected to the Senate at the inaugural 1901 federal election, winning the most votes of any candidate in Western Australia. He joined the Free Trade Party but supported Chris Watson's Australian Labor Party (ALP) government in 1904. According to Brian De Garis, he sat "in opposition to the Barton and later Deakin governments, although he was sympathetic to much of the nation-building legislation, and indeed veered at times towards protectionist policies".

Public service
He then became involved in Government Service in Papua, where in 1907 he was appointed Director of Agriculture and Mines. In 1910–11, he led an expedition into the interior, where he and his party were lost and feared dead for several weeks. Rescued with much publicity, he was hailed as an explorer and in 1923 awarded the Patron's Medal of the Royal Geographical Society.

During the First World War he served in the military from 1916 to 1918, for which he was awarded an MBE. On his return to Australia he briefly served as acting Administrator of the Northern Territory for 1919–1921, before resuming his involvement with Papua as Commissioner for Crown Lands, Mines and Agriculture.

Later life
After retiring from government service in 1930, he took up farming at Boyup Brook in Western Australia, where he died in 1934.

Memory 
The Staniforth mountain range is named after him due to role he played in the passing of the Papua Act 1905 which saw the transfer of the territory of Papua from Britain to Australia.

References

Further reading

1869 births
1934 deaths
Free Trade Party members of the Parliament of Australia
Members of the Australian Senate for Western Australia
Members of the Australian Senate
Administrators of the Northern Territory
Australian Members of the Order of the British Empire
Mayors of places in Western Australia
20th-century Australian politicians
Western Australian local councillors